Sansui County is a county in eastern Guizhou province, China, bordering Hunan province to the east. It is under the administration of the Qiandongnan Miao and Dong Autonomous Prefecture and is one of the province's eastern gateways.

Geography and climate 

Bordering counties are Xinhuang (Hunan) to the northeast, Tianzhu and Jianhe to the southeast and southwest, and Zhenyuan to the north.

Sansui has a monsoon-influenced humid subtropical climate (Köppen Cfa), with chilly, damp winters, and hot, humid summers. More than half of the annual rainfall occurs from May to August, while the annual frost-free period typically lasts 290 to 300 days.

Transportation
The county has one railway station, Sansui railway station.

References

County-level divisions of Guizhou
Counties of Qiandongnan Prefecture